The Bowling Green Falcons men's ice hockey statistical leaders are individual statistical leaders of the Bowling Green Falcons men's ice hockey program in various categories, including goals, assists, points, and saves. Within those areas, the lists identify single-game, single-season, and career leaders. The Falcons represent Bowling Green State University in the NCAA's Central Collegiate Hockey Association.

Bowling Green began competing in intercollegiate ice hockey in 1969.  These lists are updated through the end of the 2020–21 season.

Goals

Assists

Points

Saves

References

Lists of college ice hockey statistical leaders by team
Statistical